The 1920 VFL season was the 24th season of the Victorian Football League (VFL), the highest level senior Australian rules football competition in Victoria. The season featured nine clubs, ran from 1 May until 2 October, and comprised a 16-game home-and-away season followed by a finals series featuring the top four clubs.

The premiership was won by the Richmond Football Club for the first time, after it defeated  by 17 points in the 1920 VFL Grand Final.

Premiership season
In 1920, the VFL competition consisted of nine teams of 18 on-the-field players each, with no "reserves", although any of the 18 players who had left the playing field for any reason could later resume their place on the field at any time during the match.

Each team played each other twice in a home-and-away season of 18 rounds (i.e., 16 matches and 2 byes).

Once the 18 round home-and-away season had finished, the 1920 VFL Premiers were determined by the specific format and conventions of the amended "Argus system".

Round 1

|- bgcolor="#CCCCFF"
| Home team
| Home team score
| Away team
| Away team score
| Venue
| Date
|- bgcolor="#FFFFFF"
| 
| 9.13 (67)
| 
| 8.7 (55)
| MCG
| 1 May 1920
|- bgcolor="#FFFFFF"
| 
| 8.11 (59)
| 
| 11.13 (79)
| Brunswick Street Oval
| 1 May 1920
|- bgcolor="#FFFFFF"
| 
| 5.6 (36)
| 
| 7.12 (54)
| Victoria Park
| 1 May 1920
|- bgcolor="#FFFFFF"
| 
| 10.10 (70)
| 
| 5.11 (41)
| Princes Park
| 1 May 1920

Round 2

|- bgcolor="#CCCCFF"
| Home team
| Home team score
| Away team
| Away team score
| Venue
| Date
|- bgcolor="#FFFFFF"
| 
| 9.11 (65)
| 
| 12.8 (80)
| EMCG
| 8 May 1920
|- bgcolor="#FFFFFF"
| 
| 6.13 (49)
| 
| 12.7 (79)
| Lake Oval
| 8 May 1920
|- bgcolor="#FFFFFF"
| 
| 7.8 (50)
| 
| 7.13 (55)
| Corio Oval
| 8 May 1920
|- bgcolor="#FFFFFF"
| 
| 14.13 (97)
| 
| 9.14 (68)
| Punt Road Oval
| 8 May 1920

Round 3

|- bgcolor="#CCCCFF"
| Home team
| Home team score
| Away team
| Away team score
| Venue
| Date
|- bgcolor="#FFFFFF"
| 
| 7.13 (55)
| 
| 9.9 (63)
| EMCG
| 15 May 1920
|- bgcolor="#FFFFFF"
| 
| 4.20 (44)
| 
| 3.5 (23)
| Victoria Park
| 15 May 1920
|- bgcolor="#FFFFFF"
| 
| 3.11 (29)
| 
| 5.8 (38)
| Princes Park
| 15 May 1920
|- bgcolor="#FFFFFF"
| 
| 11.12 (78)
| 
| 8.8 (56)
| Junction Oval
| 15 May 1920

Round 4

|- bgcolor="#CCCCFF"
| Home team
| Home team score
| Away team
| Away team score
| Venue
| Date
|- bgcolor="#FFFFFF"
| 
| 11.15 (81)
| 
| 5.11 (41)
| MCG
| 22 May 1920
|- bgcolor="#FFFFFF"
| 
| 10.4 (64)
| 
| 9.19 (73)
| Corio Oval
| 22 May 1920
|- bgcolor="#FFFFFF"
| 
| 9.7 (61)
| 
| 7.11 (53)
| Brunswick Street Oval
| 22 May 1920
|- bgcolor="#FFFFFF"
| 
| 7.13 (55)
| 
| 14.17 (101)
| EMCG
| 22 May 1920

Round 5

|- bgcolor="#CCCCFF"
| Home team
| Home team score
| Away team
| Away team score
| Venue
| Date
|- bgcolor="#FFFFFF"
| 
| 13.18 (96)
| 
| 8.8 (56)
| Brunswick Street Oval
| 26 May 1920
|- bgcolor="#FFFFFF"
| 
| 8.6 (54)
| 
| 8.15 (63)
| Junction Oval
| 26 May 1920
|- bgcolor="#FFFFFF"
| 
| 11.12 (78)
| 
| 10.11 (71)
| Punt Road Oval
| 26 May 1920
|- bgcolor="#FFFFFF"
| 
| 8.10 (58)
| 
| 4.15 (39)
| Lake Oval
| 26 May 1920

Round 6

|- bgcolor="#CCCCFF"
| Home team
| Home team score
| Away team
| Away team score
| Venue
| Date
|- bgcolor="#FFFFFF"
| 
| 9.7 (61)
| 
| 5.4 (34)
| Punt Road Oval
| 5 June 1920
|- bgcolor="#FFFFFF"
| 
| 7.24 (66)
| 
| 13.6 (84)
| Princes Park
| 5 June 1920
|- bgcolor="#FFFFFF"
| 
| 13.26 (104)
| 
| 12.13 (85)
| EMCG
| 7 June 1920
|- bgcolor="#FFFFFF"
| 
| 12.11 (83)
| 
| 7.10 (52)
| Victoria Park
| 7 June 1920

Round 7

|- bgcolor="#CCCCFF"
| Home team
| Home team score
| Away team
| Away team score
| Venue
| Date
|- bgcolor="#FFFFFF"
| 
| 7.11 (53)
| 
| 13.10 (88)
| Junction Oval
| 12 June 1920
|- bgcolor="#FFFFFF"
| 
| 10.8 (68)
| 
| 12.16 (88)
| MCG
| 12 June 1920
|- bgcolor="#FFFFFF"
| 
| 6.7 (43)
| 
| 14.9 (93)
| Brunswick Street Oval
| 12 June 1920
|- bgcolor="#FFFFFF"
| 
| 9.16 (70)
| 
| 11.13 (79)
| Corio Oval
| 12 June 1920

Round 8

|- bgcolor="#CCCCFF"
| Home team
| Home team score
| Away team
| Away team score
| Venue
| Date
|- bgcolor="#FFFFFF"
| 
| 19.15 (129)
| 
| 8.6 (54)
| Punt Road Oval
| 19 June 1920
|- bgcolor="#FFFFFF"
| 
| 16.23 (119)
| 
| 5.16 (46)
| Lake Oval
| 19 June 1920
|- bgcolor="#FFFFFF"
| 
| 6.10 (46)
| 
| 16.12 (108)
| MCG
| 19 June 1920
|- bgcolor="#FFFFFF"
| 
| 12.13 (85)
| 
| 10.6 (66)
| Victoria Park
| 19 June 1920

Round 9

|- bgcolor="#CCCCFF"
| Home team
| Home team score
| Away team
| Away team score
| Venue
| Date
|- bgcolor="#FFFFFF"
| 
| 16.17 (113)
| 
| 6.12 (48)
| Corio Oval
| 26 June 1920
|- bgcolor="#FFFFFF"
| 
| 4.4 (28)
| 
| 14.18 (102)
| Junction Oval
| 26 June 1920
|- bgcolor="#FFFFFF"
| 
| 13.17 (95)
| 
| 11.9 (75)
| Punt Road Oval
| 26 June 1920
|- bgcolor="#FFFFFF"
| 
| 9.9 (63)
| 
| 10.7 (67)
| Lake Oval
| 26 June 1920

Round 10

|- bgcolor="#CCCCFF"
| Home team
| Home team score
| Away team
| Away team score
| Venue
| Date
|- bgcolor="#FFFFFF"
| 
| 12.13 (85)
| 
| 5.11 (41)
| Lake Oval
| 3 July 1920
|- bgcolor="#FFFFFF"
| 
| 8.12 (60)
| 
| 12.6 (78)
| Punt Road Oval
| 3 July 1920
|- bgcolor="#FFFFFF"
| 
| 8.7 (55)
| 
| 9.8 (62)
| EMCG
| 3 July 1920
|- bgcolor="#FFFFFF"
| 
| 8.9 (57)
| 
| 11.15 (81)
| Junction Oval
| 3 July 1920

Round 11

|- bgcolor="#CCCCFF"
| Home team
| Home team score
| Away team
| Away team score
| Venue
| Date
|- bgcolor="#FFFFFF"
| 
| 9.13 (67)
| 
| 8.14 (62)
| Brunswick Street Oval
| 10 July 1920
|- bgcolor="#FFFFFF"
| 
| 11.17 (83)
| 
| 5.11 (41)
| Victoria Park
| 10 July 1920
|- bgcolor="#FFFFFF"
| 
| 8.11 (59)
| 
| 3.8 (26)
| Princes Park
| 10 July 1920
|- bgcolor="#FFFFFF"
| 
| 5.13 (43)
| 
| 7.18 (60)
| MCG
| 10 July 1920

Round 12

|- bgcolor="#CCCCFF"
| Home team
| Home team score
| Away team
| Away team score
| Venue
| Date
|- bgcolor="#FFFFFF"
| 
| 16.17 (113)
| 
| 9.8 (62)
| Corio Oval
| 17 July 1920
|- bgcolor="#FFFFFF"
| 
| 8.14 (62)
| 
| 7.7 (49)
| Lake Oval
| 17 July 1920
|- bgcolor="#FFFFFF"
| 
| 8.11 (59)
| 
| 10.15 (75)
| MCG
| 17 July 1920
|- bgcolor="#FFFFFF"
| 
| 11.9 (75)
| 
| 8.14 (62)
| Brunswick Street Oval
| 17 July 1920

Round 13

|- bgcolor="#CCCCFF"
| Home team
| Home team score
| Away team
| Away team score
| Venue
| Date
|- bgcolor="#FFFFFF"
| 
| 7.9 (51)
| 
| 10.10 (70)
| EMCG
| 31 July 1920
|- bgcolor="#FFFFFF"
| 
| 5.6 (36)
| 
| 5.8 (38)
| Victoria Park
| 31 July 1920
|- bgcolor="#FFFFFF"
| 
| 11.14 (80)
| 
| 7.11 (53)
| Princes Park
| 31 July 1920
|- bgcolor="#FFFFFF"
| 
| 4.9 (33)
| 
| 7.13 (55)
| Corio Oval
| 31 July 1920

Round 14

|- bgcolor="#CCCCFF"
| Home team
| Home team score
| Away team
| Away team score
| Venue
| Date
|- bgcolor="#FFFFFF"
| 
| 7.15 (57)
| 
| 10.11 (71)
| Victoria Park
| 7 August 1920
|- bgcolor="#FFFFFF"
| 
| 13.11 (89)
| 
| 8.14 (62)
| Princes Park
| 7 August 1920
|- bgcolor="#FFFFFF"
| 
| 3.3 (21)
| 
| 11.17 (83)
| Junction Oval
| 7 August 1920
|- bgcolor="#FFFFFF"
| 
| 16.16 (112)
| 
| 5.14 (44)
| Punt Road Oval
| 7 August 1920

Round 15

|- bgcolor="#CCCCFF"
| Home team
| Home team score
| Away team
| Away team score
| Venue
| Date
|- bgcolor="#FFFFFF"
| 
| 9.7 (61)
| 
| 14.8 (92)
| Lake Oval
| 14 August 1920
|- bgcolor="#FFFFFF"
| 
| 14.10 (94)
| 
| 10.13 (73)
| Corio Oval
| 14 August 1920
|- bgcolor="#FFFFFF"
| 
| 8.7 (55)
| 
| 17.11 (113)
| Junction Oval
| 14 August 1920
|- bgcolor="#FFFFFF"
| 
| 3.7 (25)
| 
| 12.15 (87)
| MCG
| 14 August 1920

Round 16

|- bgcolor="#CCCCFF"
| Home team
| Home team score
| Away team
| Away team score
| Venue
| Date
|- bgcolor="#FFFFFF"
| 
| 10.7 (67)
| 
| 12.11 (83)
| EMCG
| 21 August 1920
|- bgcolor="#FFFFFF"
| 
| 15.14 (104)
| 
| 6.5 (41)
| Princes Park
| 21 August 1920
|- bgcolor="#FFFFFF"
| 
| 11.17 (83)
| 
| 3.14 (32)
| Lake Oval
| 21 August 1920
|- bgcolor="#FFFFFF"
| 
| 20.14 (134)
| 
| 8.12 (60)
| Punt Road Oval
| 21 August 1920

Round 17

|- bgcolor="#CCCCFF"
| Home team
| Home team score
| Away team
| Away team score
| Venue
| Date
|- bgcolor="#FFFFFF"
| 
| 11.10 (76)
| 
| 8.25 (73)
| Corio Oval
| 28 August 1920
|- bgcolor="#FFFFFF"
| 
| 16.12 (108)
| 
| 6.9 (45)
| Brunswick Street Oval
| 28 August 1920
|- bgcolor="#FFFFFF"
| 
| 16.13 (109)
| 
| 7.15 (57)
| Princes Park
| 28 August 1920
|- bgcolor="#FFFFFF"
| 
| 7.10 (52)
| 
| 12.15 (87)
| Junction Oval
| 28 August 1920

Round 18

|- bgcolor="#CCCCFF"
| Home team
| Home team score
| Away team
| Away team score
| Venue
| Date
|- bgcolor="#FFFFFF"
| 
| 22.17 (149)
| 
| 11.3 (69)
| Brunswick Street Oval
| 4 September 1920
|- bgcolor="#FFFFFF"
| 
| 6.5 (41)
| 
| 15.14 (104)
| EMCG
| 4 September 1920
|- bgcolor="#FFFFFF"
| 
| 16.12 (108)
| 
| 13.13 (91)
| Victoria Park
| 4 September 1920
|- bgcolor="#FFFFFF"
| 
| 12.15 (87)
| 
| 17.14 (116)
| MCG
| 4 September 1920

Ladder

Finals

All of the 1920 finals were played at the MCG so the home team in the semi-finals and preliminary final is purely the higher ranked team from the ladder but in the Grand Final the home team was the team that won the preliminary final.

Semi-finals

|- bgcolor="#CCCCFF"
| Home team
| Score
| Away team
| Score
| Venue
| Date
|- bgcolor="#FFFFFF"
| 
| 4.17 (41)
| 
| 3.5 (23)
| MCG
| 11 September
|- bgcolor="#FFFFFF"
| 
| 7.11 (53)
| 
| 4.6 (30)
| MCG
| 18 September

Preliminary final

|- bgcolor="#CCCCFF"
| Home team
| Score
| Away team
| Score
| Venue
| Date
|- bgcolor="#FFFFFF"
| 
| 12.11 (83)
| 
| 8.11 (59)
| MCG
| 25 September

Grand final

Richmond defeated Collingwood 7.10 (52) to 5.5 (35), in front of a crowd of 53,908 people. (For an explanation of scoring see Australian rules football).

Awards
 The 1920 VFL Premiership team was Richmond.
 The VFL's leading goalkicker was George Bayliss of Richmond with 63 goals.
 St Kilda took the "wooden spoon" in 1920.
 The Victorian Junior League premiership, which is today recognised as the VFL reserves premiership, was won by 's team, Collingwood District, for the second straight year. Collingwood District 7.14 (56) defeated University 7.2 (44) in the final, played as a curtain-raiser to the senior Preliminary Final on 25 September at the Melbourne Cricket Ground.

Notable events
 All Round 5 games were played on Wednesday, 26 May, to coincide with a visit by the Prince of Wales.
 After only three VFL games, Carlton's half-forward Horrie Clover was selected in the Victorian team that narrowly beat South Australia 10.11 (71) to 9.12 (66) in a match played at the Melbourne Cricket Ground in front of the Prince of Wales.
 Richmond's recruit from Kyabram, Billy James, aged 20, played his first senior game in the Grand Final, and kicked the final goal of the match (his only goal) in the last quarter. He badly injured his foot in a rabbit shooting accident before the start of the 1921 season, and never played again.
 At the end of the season, tired with the constant internal dissent at St Kilda, Roy Cazaly was granted a clearance to South Melbourne.
 Vic Cumberland, after four years away from football (he had been wounded three times in World War I), played 10 senior games for St Kilda in 1920, aged 43, making him the oldest player in VFL/AFL history.
 In Round 17, in the process of kicking 8.25 (73) in its 3-point loss to Geelong, South Melbourne hit the post nine times.
 Unable to tolerate the increasing levels of assaults, thrown projectiles, and ground invasions, umpires threatened to go on strike unless given stronger police protection.

Footnotes

References
 Hogan, P., The Tigers of Old, The Richmond Football Club, (Richmond), 1996. 
 Rogers, S. & Brown, A., Every Game Ever Played: VFL/AFL Results 1897–1997 (Sixth Edition), Viking Books, (Ringwood), 1998. 
 Ross, J. (ed), 100 Years of Australian Football 1897–1996: The Complete Story of the AFL, All the Big Stories, All the Great Pictures, All the Champions, Every AFL Season Reported, Viking, (Ringwood), 1996.

External links
 1920 Season - AFL Tables

Australian Football League seasons
VFL season